Bezzina nigrapex is a species of tephritid or fruit flies in the genus Bezzina of the family Tephritidae.

Distribution
South Africa.

References

Tephritinae
Insects described in 1937
Diptera of Africa